Papyrus 111, designated by  (in the Gregory-Aland numbering of New Testament manuscripts), is a copy of the New Testament in Greek. It is a papyrus manuscript of the Gospel of Luke, containing verses 17:11-13 & 17:22-23 in a fragmentary condition. Using the study of comparative writing styles (palaeography), it has been dated by the INTF to the 3rd century CE. Papyrologist Philip Comfort dates the manuscript to the first half of the 3rd century CE.
The manuscript is currently housed at the Sackler Library (Papyrology Rooms, P. Oxy. 4495) at Oxford.

Description 
Due to the fragmentary nature of the manuscript, it's not possible to determine the manuscript page's original width and length. But from the extant text, P. Comfort estimates around 21-22 lines a page. The handwriting script is representative of the Documentary style.

The manuscript has only one nomen sacrum extant: .

Textual Variants 
Luke 17:12(1) 
 απηντησαν :   A B W Ψ Majority of manuscripts
 υπηντησαν :  L N Θ ƒ 579 892 1241 2542 al

Luke 17:12(2) 
 πορωθεν : 
 πορρωθεν :   A B W Ψ Majority of manuscripts

Luke 17:22
 του επιθυμησαι :  D 157 ƒ 
 οτε επιθυμησεται :  A B 
 οτε επιθυμησηται : B*
 οτε επιθυμησητε :  Majority of manuscripts

See also 

 List of New Testament papyri
 Oxyrhynchus Papyri

References

Further reading 

 W. E. H. Cockle, The Oxyrhynchus Papyri LXVI (London: 1999), pp. 19–20.

External links

Images 
 P.Oxy.LXIV 4495 from Papyrology at Oxford's "POxy: Oxyrhynchus Online" 
 Image from 𝔓111 recto, fragment of Luke 17:11-13 
 Image from 𝔓111 verso, fragment of Luke 17:22-23

Official registration 
 "Continuation of the Manuscript List" Institute for New Testament Textual Research, University of Münster. Retrieved April 9, 2008.

New Testament papyri
3rd-century biblical manuscripts
Early Greek manuscripts of the New Testament
Gospel of Luke papyri